The Ashdown Commercial Historic District encompasses part of the historic commercial heart of Ashdown, the county seat of Little River County, Arkansas.  This area was developed primarily between 1905 and 1945, and represents the city's growth during that time as a cotton and lumber center.  It covers a roughly two-block area bounded on the west by an alley west of East Main Street, on the north by Keller Street, on the east by Whitaker Street, and on the south by North Constitution Street (United States Route 59).  Prominent early buildings in the district include the R. M. Price Building (46 E. Main Street), a large two-story brick building built 1905, the 1915 Dixie Theater, and the 1905 Little River News building at 45A E. Main Street.  Stylistically distinctive is the 1947 Williams Theater at 360 Keller Street, which is the only Art Deco building in the area.

The district was listed on the National Register of Historic Places in 2008.

See also
National Register of Historic Places listings in Little River County, Arkansas

References

Historic districts on the National Register of Historic Places in Arkansas
Art Deco architecture in Arkansas
Buildings and structures completed in 1905
Buildings and structures in Little River County, Arkansas
Buildings designated early commercial in the National Register of Historic Places
National Register of Historic Places in Little River County, Arkansas
1905 establishments in Arkansas